John Sully (9 April 1920 – 24 November 2010) was a South African sailor. He competed in the 12m² Sharpie event at the 1956 Summer Olympics.

References

External links
 

1920 births
2010 deaths
South African male sailors (sport)
Olympic sailors of South Africa
Sailors at the 1956 Summer Olympics – 12 m2 Sharpie
Place of birth missing